The Deportivo Dongu Fútbol Club, commonly known as Dongu, is a Mexican football club based in Cuautitlán. The club was founded in 2015 as Deportivo Gladiadores Fútbol Club, and currently plays in the Serie A of Liga Premier. 

In 2019, Deportivo Gladiadores was dissolved and the club was refounded as Deportivo Dongu, but the club kept the squad and coaching staff from Gladiadores.

Players

Current squad

Reserve teams
Deportivo Dongu F.C. (Liga TDP)
Reserve team that plays in the Liga TDP, the fourth level of the Mexican league system.

References

External links 

Football clubs in the State of Mexico
Association football clubs established in 2015
2015 establishments in Mexico
Liga Premier de México